Mangifera rubropetala was a species of plant in the  family Anacardiaceae. It was found in possibly Indonesia and Malaysia.

References

rubropetala
Taxonomy articles created by Polbot
Taxa named by André Joseph Guillaume Henri Kostermans